The National Glass Workers' Trade Protection Association was a trade union in the United Kingdom.

The union was founded in 1920, when the Yorkshire Glass Bottle Makers' United Trade Protection Society merged with the majority of the National Glass Bottle Makers' Society.  Based in Castleford, it merged with the Transport and General Workers' Union in 1940.

General Secretaries
1920: John Thompson
1924: R. Fenton

References

Arthur Ivor Marsh, Victoria Ryan. Historical Directory of Trade Unions, Volume 5 Ashgate Publishing, Ltd., Jan 1, 2006 pg. 435

Defunct trade unions of the United Kingdom
History of glass
Glass trade unions
Trade unions established in 1920
Trade unions disestablished in 1940
Transport and General Workers' Union amalgamations
Trade unions based in West Yorkshire